Ptilotrigona lurida, known as the borá-cavalo, abelha-piranha ("piranha bee"), or corta-cabelos ("hair-cutting bee") in Brazil, is a species of eusocial stingless bee in the family Apidae and tribe Meliponini.

See also 
 Tetragona clavipes (borá)
 Tetragona quadrangula (borá-de-chão)
 Tetragona goettei

References 

Meliponini
Hymenoptera of South America
Hymenoptera of Brazil
Insects described in 1854